East Orange School District is a comprehensive community public school district serving students in pre-Kindergarten through twelfth grade from the city of East Orange, in Essex County, New Jersey, United States. The district is one of 31 former Abbott districts statewide that were established pursuant to the decision by the New Jersey Supreme Court in Abbott v. Burke which are now referred to as "SDA Districts" based on the requirement for the state to cover all costs for school building and renovation projects in these districts under the supervision of the New Jersey Schools Development Authority.
As of the 2018–19 school year, the district, comprised of 20 schools, had an enrollment of 10,072 students and 744.0 classroom teachers (on an FTE basis), for a student–teacher ratio of 13.5:1.

In 2003, Patrick Healy Middle School was identified as one of seven "persistently dangerous" public schools in New Jersey. The designation has since been removed.

The district is classified by the New Jersey Department of Education as being in District Factor Group "A", the lowest of eight groupings. District Factor Groups organize districts statewide to allow comparison by common socioeconomic characteristics of the local districts. From lowest socioeconomic status to highest, the categories are A, B, CD, DE, FG, GH, I and J.

Schools
Schools in the district (with 2018–19 enrollment data from the National Center for Education Statistics) are:

Early childhood education centers
Althea Gibson Early Childhood Academy (159 students; in grades PreK and K)
Crystal Davis, Principal
Wahlstrom Early Childhood Center (156; PreK-K)
Annie Jackson, Principal

Elementary schools
Benjamin Banneker Academy (511; PreK-5)
Sharon Vincent, Principal
Edward T. Bowser, Sr. School of Excellence (609; PreK-5)
Brian Heaphy, Principal
George Washington Carver Institute of Science and Technology (325; PreK-5)
Dr. Sharon Alsbrook Davis, Principal
Johnnie L. Cochran Jr. Academy (193; K-5)
Dr. Tabina H. Adam, Principal
Mildred Barry Garvin School (356; PreK-5)
Dr. Howard Walker, Principal
Whitney E. Houston Academy of Creative & Performing Arts (369; PreK-8)
Henry Hamilton, Principal
Langston Hughes Elementary School (589; PreK-5)
Thelma Ramsey, Principal
J. Garfield Jackson Sr. Academy (256; K-5)
Yvy Joseph, Principal
Ecole Touissant Louverture (297; PreK-5)
Ralph Jacob, Jr., Principal
Gordon Parks Academy School of Radio, Animation, Film and Television (285; PreK-5)
Leslie Shults, Principal
Cicely L. Tyson Community Elementary School (504; PreK-5)
Passion Moss-Hasan, Principal
Dionne Warwick Institute of Economics and Entrepreneurship (462; PreK-5)
Flore Nadeige Lovett, Principal

Middle schools
Future Ready Prep (NA; 6-7)
Dr. Renee N. Richardson, Administrator
Patrick F. Healy Middle School (392; 7)
Dr. Howard Walker, Principal
John L. Costley Middle School (367; 8). The school was named in honor of John L. Costley Sr., a local community activist who was a World War I veteran and member of the 369th Infantry Regiment, also known as the Harlem Hellfighters.
Koree Toles, Principal
Sojourner Truth Middle School (406; 6)
Dr. Monica Burton, Principal

High schools
Cicely Tyson School of Performing and Fine Arts (740; 6-12)
John English, Principal
East Orange Campus High School located on the former campus of Upsala College (1,651; 9-12) 
Ronnie Estrict, Principal
East Orange STEM Academy (358; 9-12)
Dr. Vincent Stallings, Principal

Other
Fresh Start Academy Middle / High - Glenwood Campus (NA; 6-12)

Administration
Core members of the district's administration are:
Abdulsaleem Hasan, Superintendent of Schools
Christina Hunt, School Business Administrator

Board of education
The district's board of education is comprised of seven members who set policy and oversee the fiscal and educational operation of the district through its administration. As a Type I school district, the board's trustees are appointed by the Mayor to serve three-year terms of office on a staggered basis, with either two or three members up for reappointment each year. Of the more than 600 school districts statewide, East Orange is one of 15 districts with an appointed school board. The board appoints a superintendent to oversee the district's day-to-day operations and a business administrator to supervise the business functions of the district.

References

External links 

East Orange School District
 
School Data for the East Orange School District, National Center for Education Statistics

East Orange, New Jersey
New Jersey Abbott Districts
New Jersey District Factor Group A
School districts in Essex County, New Jersey